Jesus Manuel Rojas Diaz (born December 26, 1986 in Caguas, Puerto Rico) is a Puerto Rican boxer who is the former WBA (Regular) featherweight champion.

Professional career

After turning professional in 2006 Rojas amassed a record of 25-1-2-1 in 11 years before challenging and beating Dominican Claudio Marrero for the interim WBA featherweight title. 

In July 2018 the World Boxing Association announced that Rojas has been upgraded to 'Regular champion' and that he will be making his first defense against Mexican American boxer Joseph Diaz. Diaz however, came into the fight overweight, missing the required weight limit by 0.6 pounds. According to WBA rules, this meant that Rojas gets to keep his title regardless of the outcome of the fight. Diaz would end up handing Rojas his first defeat in 10 years, by a 12-round unanimous decision.

In a fight deemed an early "fight of the year" candidate, Rojas was defending his WBA title against Chinese star and WBA #2 at featherweight Can Xu. Xu edged out Rojas in a highly controversial unanimous decision. The official scorecards, 118-110, 117-111, and 116-112 were in wide favor of Xu, even though the punch output from Rojas suggested that the fight was much closer than that.

Professional boxing record

See also
List of world featherweight boxing champions
List of Puerto Rican boxing world champions

References

External links

Jesus Rojas - Profile, News Archive & Current Rankings at Box.Live

|-

|-

1986 births
Living people
Super-bantamweight boxers
Featherweight boxers
World featherweight boxing champions
World Boxing Association champions
Puerto Rican male boxers
People from Caguas, Puerto Rico